Lick Creek is a stream in Moniteau and Morgan County in the U.S. state of Missouri. It is a tributary of Smith Creek.

Lick Creek was so named on account of mineral licks near its course.

References

Rivers of Moniteau County, Missouri
Rivers of Morgan County, Missouri
Rivers of Missouri